John Robert Leonetti,  (born July 4, 1956) is an American cinematographer and film director. He is known for his collaborative work with director James Wan, with whom he has acted as cinematographer on five films. He is the younger brother of cinematographer Matthew F. Leonetti, who was the cinematographer for John's first feature-length film as director, Mortal Kombat: Annihilation.

Career 
Leonetti began his career as a teenager working for his family's motion picture equipment business that was started by his father Frank Leonetti, known for his gaffing work on films such as The Wizard of Oz and Singin' in the Rain. Leonetti was a cinematographer on feature films such as Child's Play 3, The Mask, and Mortal Kombat. He began his filmmaking career with Mortal Kombat: Annihilation, and has gone on to direct The Butterfly Effect 2, Annabelle, and Wish Upon.

Filmography

Feature films

References

External links

1956 births
Living people
American cinematographers
Film directors from California
Horror film directors